John Sherman Baker (November 21, 1861 – April 6, 1955) was an American politician in the state of Washington. He served in the Washington State Senate from 1889 to 1893.

Biography
John S. Baker was born in Cleveland on November 21, 1861.

He died in Tacoma on April 6, 1955.

References

1861 births
1955 deaths
Republican Party Washington (state) state senators
Politicians from Cleveland